Cheng Hefang (born 1 September 1995) is a Chinese para-badminton player who has played each of the three variations of the sport (women's singles, women's doubles, and mixed doubles) at the highest world level.

In 2021, Cheng won a silver medal representing China in the women's doubles SL3–SU5 event of the 2020 Summer Paralympics alongside Ma Huihui, having lost to Leani Ratri Oktila and Khalimatus Sadiyah in the gold medal match, but won a gold medal in the women's singles SL4 event, defeating Leani Ratri Oktila.

Achievements

Paralympic Games

Women's singles

Women's doubles

World Championships 

Women's singles

Women’s doubles

Asian Para Games 

Women's singles

Women’s doubles

Asian Championships 
Women's singles

Women's doubles

Mixed doubles

International Tournaments (9 titles, 6 runners-up) 
Women's singles

Men's doubles

Mixed doubles

References

Notes

1995 births
Living people
Chinese female badminton players
Chinese para-badminton players
Paralympic badminton players of China
Paralympic gold medalists for China
Paralympic silver medalists for China
Paralympic medalists in badminton
Badminton players at the 2020 Summer Paralympics
Medalists at the 2020 Summer Paralympics